Ciniflella is a genus of South American false wolf spiders containing the single species, Ciniflella lutea. It was first described by Cândido Firmino de Mello-Leitão in 1921, and has only been found in Brazil.

References

Monotypic Araneomorphae genera
Spiders of Brazil
Taxa named by Cândido Firmino de Mello-Leitão
Zoropsidae